Michael Wayne Korney (born September 15, 1953) is a Canadian retired professional ice hockey player. He played in 77 games in the National Hockey League with the Detroit Red Wings and New York Rangers between 1973 and 1978..

Mike played 2 years for his hometown Dauphin Kings, winning Manitoba in his final year (1971–72), before moving up to the Western Canada Hockey League with the Winnipeg Jets. HE was selecte by the Detroit Red Wings in 4th round (59th overall) in the 1973 NHL Amateur Draft.

Career statistics

Regular season and playoffs

External links
 
 Profile at hockeydraftcentral.com

1953 births
Living people
Canadian expatriate ice hockey players in England
Canadian expatriate ice hockey players in the United States
Canadian ice hockey defencemen
Dauphin Kings players
Detroit Red Wings draft picks
Detroit Red Wings players
Hampton Gulls (SHL) players
Ice hockey people from Manitoba
Kansas City Blues players
London Lions (ice hockey) players
Maine Mariners players
Milwaukee Admirals (IHL) players
New Haven Nighthawks players
New York Rangers players
Oklahoma City Blazers (1965–1977) players
Port Huron Wings players
Providence Reds players
Sportspeople from Dauphin, Manitoba
Salt Lake Golden Eagles (CHL) players
Springfield Indians players
Syracuse Firebirds players
Tulsa Oilers (1964–1984) players
Vancouver Blazers draft picks
Virginia Wings players
Winnipeg Jets (WHL) players